USCGC Thunder Bay (WTGB-108) is the eighth vessel of the  built in 1985 and operated by the United States Coast Guard. The ship was named after a bay in the U.S. state of Michigan on Lake Huron.

Design 

The  Bay-class tugboats operated primarily for domestic ice breaking duties. They are named after American Bays and are stationed mainly in the northeast United States and the Great Lakes.

WTGBs use a low pressure air hull lubrication or bubbler system that forces air and water between the hull and ice. This system improves icebreaking capabilities by reducing resistance against the hull, reducing horsepower requirements.

Construction and career 
Thunder Bay was built by the Bay City Marine Inc., in Tacoma, Washington in 1985. She was launched on 31 July 1985 and later commissioned in 1986.

On 4 February 2021, Thunder Bay conducted a icebreaking mission at the Penobscot River. On 18 June, the ship finished the In-Service Vessel Sustainment program and departed Coast Guard Yard in Curtis Bay, Maryland.

Awards 

 Transportation 9-11 Ribbon
 Coast Guard Presidential Unit Citation
 Secretary of Transportation Outstanding Unit Award 
 Coast Guard Unit Commendation 
 Coast Guard Meritorious Unit Commendation 
 Coast Guard Meritorious Team Commendation 
 Coast Guard Bicentennial Unit Commendation 
 National Defense Service Medal 
 Global War on Terrorism Service Medal  
 Humanitarian Service Medal 
 Coast Guard Special Operations Service Ribbon 
 Coast Guard Sea Service Ribbon

References

United States Coast Guard home page
United States Coast Guard Reservist Magazine

External links 

 TogetherWeServed: Thunder Bay Crew Members

Thunder Bay
1985 ships
Ships built in Tacoma, Washington